Aminomethanol or methanolamine is the amino alcohol with the chemical formula of H2NCH2OH. With an amino group and an alcohol group on the same carbon atom, the compound is also an hemiaminal. 

In aqueous solution, methanolamine exists in equilibrium with formaldehyde and ammonia.  It is an intermediate en route to hexamethylenetetramine. The reaction can be conducted in gas phase and in solution.

References 

Primary alcohols
Amines